Resident Evil Village is a 2021 survival horror game developed and published by Capcom. It is the sequel to Resident Evil 7: Biohazard (2017). Players control Ethan Winters, who searches for his kidnapped daughter in a village filled with mutant creatures. Village maintains survival horror elements from previous Resident Evil games, with players scavenging environments for items and managing resources. However, it adds more action-oriented gameplay, with higher enemy counts and a greater emphasis on combat.

Resident Evil Village was announced at the PlayStation 5 reveal event in June 2020 and was released on May 7, 2021 for PlayStation 4, PlayStation 5, Stadia, Windows, Xbox One, and Xbox Series X/S, followed by a macOS version and a cloud version for Nintendo Switch in October 2022. It received generally favorable reviews, with praise for its gameplay, setting, and variety, but criticism for its puzzles, boss fights, and performance issues on the Windows version; the increased focus on action divided opinions. Resident Evil Village won year-end accolades including Game of the Year at the Golden Joystick Awards. The game sold 7.4 million units by January 2023.

Gameplay
Like its predecessor, Resident Evil 7: Biohazard, Resident Evil Village uses a first-person perspective. It is set in a snowy explorable Eastern European village, described as "pulled straight from the Victorian era" and much larger and more immersive than its predecessor. Structures and buildings in the central village can be climbed and used to fight enemies. Compared to Biohazard, the game is more action focused, with protagonist Ethan Winters now equipped with more combat skills due to military training. The game's primary enemies, the werewolf-like Lycans, are not only agile and intelligent, but can wield weapons and attack in packs, forcing the player to rethink their strategy on whether to use sparse ammunition, use melee combat, or simply run away. Similar to Resident Evil 4 (2005), makeshift barricades can be used to fend off enemies.

The inventory management mechanic is similar to that of Resident Evil 4, featuring a briefcase and the ability to move and rotate items for better storage space. Players can buy supplies, weapons, upgrades, and items from a merchant called the Duke. The players can also hunt animals in the village and have them cooked into dishes by the Duke. Eating side dishes allows the player to gain certain advantages such as decreasing the damage taken while blocking. Treasures and collectibles can be found around the village, and sold to the Duke for currency.

Players can manually save the game progress by locating and using typewriters, which replaces the tape recorders seen in Resident Evil 7 and marks their first appearance in a mainline game since Resident Evil 4. A map of the village can be accessed from the pause menu, as well as a diary with sketches recapping the player's progress in the story so far. Two new features added to the game were photo mode, which gave players the opportunity to screenshot in-game moments, and a button to skip cutscenes.

The Mercenaries Mode, an arcade-style game mode of past Resident Evil games, returns in Village. In this mode, players fight through timed stages, and purchase items and upgrades from the Duke’s Emporium. Players who purchased Village also received Resident Evil Re:Verse, a six-player online multiplayer third-person shooter, when Re:Verse released in October 2022.

Synopsis

Setting 
Resident Evil Village is set three years after the events of Resident Evil 7, largely on the day of February 9, 2021. Ethan Winters returns as the protagonist, having defeated bioweapon Eveline in Resident Evil 7. Ethan has been living with his wife Mia and six-month-old daughter Rosemary when Chris Redfield—the protagonist of previous Resident Evil entries—and his men suddenly appear, murder his wife in cold blood, and kidnap him and his baby daughter, bringing them to a mysterious European village. Ethan has to traverse the village to rescue Rosemary. The village is invaded by werewolf-like mutants called Lycans and governed by four different mutant lords, each controlling their own forces from strongholds within the village. Lady Alcina Dimitrescu, an unusually tall vampiric aristocrat, resides at Castle Dimitrescu with her three daughters Bela, Cassandra, and Daniela, and mutated female attendants. The hallucination-inducing and ghost-like Donna Beneviento rules from her mansion, House Beneviento, and acts through her puppet Angie. The grotesque Salvatore Moreau operates from a reservoir in close proximity to the village and is described as a "merman". Karl Heisenberg, who can manipulate electromagnetic fields, leads a group of Soldat simulacra from a contemporary factory. All houses respond to a supreme leader figure called Mother Miranda, the witch-like ruler of the village who is a "presence worshipped by the villagers."

Plot 
Three years after Resident Evil 7, Ethan and Mia have been relocated to Europe by Chris Redfield to start a new life with their newborn daughter Rosemary. One night, Chris and his Hound Wolf squad raid the house, assassinate Mia, and abduct Ethan and Rosemary. Ethan awakens next to a crashed transport truck in which he was riding, and discovers a village terrorized by Lycans, werewolf-like creatures. Ethan fails to save the remaining villagers and is captured and brought before the village priest Mother Miranda and her lords: Alcina Dimitrescu, Donna Beneviento, Salvatore Moreau, and Karl Heisenberg. Ethan escapes a death trap made by Heisenberg and ventures into Dimitrescu's castle to find Rosemary, with help from a mysterious merchant known as the Duke. Ethan eliminates Dimitrescu and her daughters, finding a flask containing Rosemary's head. The Duke explains that Miranda placed Rosemary's body parts in four different flasks for a special rite, and that she can be restored if Ethan recovers the other flasks, held by the remaining lords.

While killing Beneviento and Moreau for their flasks, Ethan learns Hound Wolf is also in the village. Ethan passes a test from Heisenberg for the fourth flask and is invited to the lord's factory, where Heisenberg proposes they defeat Miranda together. Ethan refuses, once he learns Heisenberg intends to weaponize Rosemary, and escapes. Ethan encounters and confronts Chris over Mia's death, learning the "Mia" Chris killed was Miranda in disguise. Chris reveals that Miranda possesses the power of mimicry and was attempting to abduct Rosemary, succeeding when she crashed the transport truck. Chris destroys Heisenberg's factory while Ethan uses a makeshift tank to defeat Heisenberg. Miranda confronts Ethan and kills him after she reveals her plans to take Rosemary as her own.

Witnessing Ethan's death, Chris leads Hound Wolf to extract Rosemary while a Bioterrorism Security Assessment Alliance (BSAA) assault force distracts Miranda. He plants a bomb on the Megamycete and finds Miranda's lab, learning that she has lived a century since coming into contact with the Megamycete, and was a mentor to the Umbrella Corporation's founder Oswell E. Spencer; Oswell used her knowledge to develop the t-Virus. Miranda experimented with the fungus in an attempt to revive her daughter, Eva, who had succumbed to the Spanish flu; the four lords, Lycans, and Eveline were failed experiments. Rosemary, however, is a suitable host, due to her special abilities inherited from Ethan and Mia. Chris rescues the imprisoned Mia, who reveals that Ethan is still alive, due to his powers.

Ethan revives after encountering Eveline in limbo, who reveals that he was killed in his first encounter with Jack Baker in Dulvey, but was revived by her mold, which gave him regenerative powers. The Duke brings Ethan to the ritual site where Miranda attempts to revive Eva, but instead revives Rosemary. An enraged Miranda battles Ethan, who kills her, before the Megamycete emerges from the ground. Ethan, with his regenerative powers having reached their limit, sacrifices himself to detonate the bomb planted on the Megamycete, while Chris transports Mia and Rosemary to safety. As Mia mourns the loss of Ethan, Chris discovers that the BSAA soldiers sent to the village were organic bioweapons and orders his squad to head for the BSAA's European headquarters.

Shadows of Rose 
Rose, now sixteen years old, has been separated from Mia while under the protection of Chris. She has become a social outcast due to her abilities gained from the Megamycete, and resents her powers. Canine, a member of the Hound Wolf Squad, informs her from Miranda's research that there is a Purifying Crystal within the realm of the Megamycete that can remove Rose's abilities; he proposes that she find the rest of Miranda's research inside the consciousness of the Megamycete fragment that he has salvaged. Rose uses her powers to enter the mind of the Megamycete, where she discovers herself in a realm similar to Dimitrescu's castle. She finds it covered in spewing mold, with monsters led by a version of the Duke attacking and killing clones of herself. She is helped by a guiding spirit whom she names Michael. Despite Michael's advice to leave the Megamycete, Rose persists, wanting to rid herself of her powers. With Michael's help, Rose escapes the castle but falls into a deeper stratum within the Megamycete. 

Rose finds herself in a replica of Beneviento's house, where she relives her traumatic childhood, with the realm's leader blaming her father's absence. To comfort Rose, Michael shows her a realm similar to her house as a baby. The realm's perpetrator reveals herself to be Eveline, seeking to kill Rose out of jealousy over being a failed and unloved experiment. Michael once again helps Rose escape. Rose finds herself in another deeper stratum that resembles the village where she was kidnapped. There, she discovers and uses the Purifying Crystal to remove her powers, but also finds the consciousness of Miranda, who reveals that Canine was an illusion to lure Rose into the Megamycete. Still determined to revive Eva, Miranda intends to use Rose as a vessel now that she is powerless. Michael manifests, reveals himself to be Ethan's consciousness within the Megamycete, and helps Rose escape. Ethan is heavily wounded and encourages her to leave, but Rose breaks the crystal and embraces her powers to destroy Miranda. Rose embraces her father, who apologizes for not being there for her upbringing but declares that he is proud of her. Rose leaves the Megamycete's consciousness and visits Ethan's grave before being called away on a mission for the BSAA. As she and her escort drive off into the distance, an unknown figure is seen approaching their vehicle.

Development
Resident Evil Village was in development for approximately three and a half years before its announcement in June 2020. Capcom asked the Resident Evil team to start development on August 8, 2016, while Resident Evil 7 was still about a half a year from release, according to director Morimasa Sato. Without having RE7 release to judge its success, the team kept the initial designs around the core survival horror gameplay roots that had been in Resident Evil 4 (RE4) and had been a return to form in RE7. During this early period they came up with the concept of the village as the central theme, inspired by RE4, where its village was also a central location as well as many of the gameplay mechanics established by the title. The team used RE4 approach to create "a balance of combat, exploration, and puzzle solving". Sato said that for the new game, "we're bringing the essence of Resident Evil 4, while Resident Evil 7 functions as the base for the game". Looking back at the use of horror of RE7, producer Tsuyoshi Kanda said, "One of the lessons we took away is that this isn't something that is black and white, it's always going to have some variation or modification, and figuring out, OK, this worked for [RE7], but rather than replicating it, let's find a variation that works for a wider audience." The development team opted for a more balanced take on action and horror for Village.

RE7 was released in January 2017 and was well received by critics and players, so the team decided to make the next game a direct sequel to RE7, keeping its protagonist Ethan Winters as the main character and retaining the same style of gameplay. According to Kanda, this also helped to complete Ethan's story that was left open in RE7. The team had become attached to his character, and worked to devise a story for him with the other Resident Evil teams within Capcom.

As they continued to develop the village, Sato said they wanted to give players more freedom toward solving problems, and make it "a horror movie that you can play". Kanda said that like with RE4, they were able to incorporate a variety of different themes of horror within the village, leading Capcom to describe the village as "a theme park of horror". In contrast to past Resident Evil games that generally have been linear progressions, the team created a more open world-style village, with optional and secret areas, designed to reward the player for exploration. The main story remained in a pre-set order that the team felt best for how the player should experience it. He said that compared to the claustrophobic feeling of the Baker mansion in RE7, the horror in the game came from the uncertainty on what lurks in the "openness" of the village, while easing the "tension curve" compared to the previous game through quiet moments such as save points. Sato also stated that the village's snowy weather was inspired by the team's trip to Europe for research for the game, where they were met by an "unseasonable cold snap, the scenery was covered in snow. This inspired us to implement snowscapes into our game. We use snow not just for visual presentation, but as gameplay elements as well.” While it is recognized by Capcom as the eighth main game in the series, and its logo stylized to include the Roman numeral "VIII" for 8, the producers stylized the title to emphasise on the "village" aspect rather than the "8". In a Famitsu interview, producers Kanda and Peter Fabiano said that they considered the village a character, and wanted to reflect that in the stylization of the title so that players would remember it. Development on the game was hampered by the COVID-19 pandemic in Japan, at one point bringing the development process to a halt for a month.

Like RE7, Village was developed with the RE Engine. According to art director Tomonori Takano, the developmental team drew inspiration from Resident Evil 4 as they wanted memorable characters to populate the village. Takano said the developers wanted to continue the same approach that started with Resident Evil 7 in that they wanted to move away from simply using elements like zombies to scare players but created unique situations and characters that would create fear in new ways. Capcom had considered populating the game's castle and village with hundreds of witches but found this difficult to conceptualize. The team decided to switch directions from witches to vampires for Lady Dimitrescu and her daughters, albeit avoiding stereotypical tropes of vampires in popular culture. Castle Dimitrescu was also inspired by Peleș Castle in Romania.

The other three Houses in the villages drew from other classic gothic horror themes of simulacra, mermen, and ghosts for Heisenberg, Moreau, and Beneviento, respectively. Karl Heisenberg is characterized as an engineer with an extravagant dress sense inspired by men's fashion from the 1960s; his base of operations is not covered in snow unlike the other lords', likely due to the lower altitude of its location. Salvatore Moreau was conceived as "the most repulsive character on Earth"; his domain was originally inspired by a frozen lake the team sighted during a research trip in Eastern Europe. House Beneviento furthered some of the ideas that the team had used in Resident Evil 7, with Sato noting that the fully veiled Donna Beneviento and her puppet Angie are considered to be the scariest of the four lords by his American colleagues, even though the team approached Angie's design with an instant impact in mind rather than being purely frightening. For major antagonist Mother Miranda, Takano stated that crows were the primary motif of her design, noting them being symbolic in the game's village, as well as functioning as an overarching design theme for the game.

The Lycans' werewolf-like design was developed with the game's gothic horror setting in mind, with Sato explaining, "[They] very much spawned from the fact that we wanted to create an enemy that represented the village...We designed it very much where this is kind of the twisted outcome of a human being where we draw a lot of inspiration from werewolves, being able to tap into that gothic horror visual."

Chris Redfield, a prominent protagonist in several Resident Evil entries since the first game, appears as a major supporting character in Village; however, he is instead shown as more nefarious in the game's trailers due to killing Mia and kidnapping Rosemary, which surprised longtime fans. Kanda described Chris's appearance in the game as "a much darker, more sinister role," in contrast to his previous heroic portrayal in the series. Chris's actions serve as a major mystery to the game, which Capcom felt was an opportunity to showcase the character's progression to fans who were already familiar with him. Chris eventually becomes playable towards the end of Village, where the game briefly transitions from survival horror gameplay into a more action-heavy segment due to Chris's veteran experience in fighting bioweapons, which Andy Kelly of PC Gamer saw as a "cathartic moment for players who have been carefully conserving ammunition up until that point."

Similar to Resident Evil 3 (2020), Resident Evil Village included a six-player online multiplayer third-person shooter game titled Resident Evil Re:Verse, developed by NeoBards Entertainment. Originally meant to launch on the same day as the main game, the game was delayed until summer 2021, and was delayed again before releasing on October 28, 2022 for PlayStation 4, Windows, and Xbox One.

Release and promotion
Lady Dimitrescu, a character who rose in popularity prior to the game's release, was featured extensively in promotional material and merchandise prior to the game's launch. To promote the game, Capcom announced that a special lottery event would be held to give away a free Resident Evil Village acrylic jigsaw puzzle which could be entered by tweeting the hashtag #VILLAGE予約. On March 3, AMD announced that the PC version would feature ray tracing and AMD FidelityFX. Resident Evil Village was the featured cover game in the April 2021 issue of Game Informer. On April 30, 2021, a puppet show featuring the four lords was released on YouTube, with each puppet claiming that they are not scary. On May 11, 2021, Capcom released a video that showed a behind-the-scenes on their YouTube channel on working on the game's theme song, "Village of Shadows".

Maiden, the first of two demos, was released exclusively for the PlayStation 5 on January 21, 2021. For PS4 and PS5 users, an early access demo Village was released on April 15, 2021. It allowed players 30 minutes to explore the village and was playable only once and live for eight hours. The Castle demo was released for PlayStation early access users on April 24, 2021. It allowed players to explore the castle for 30 minutes, it was also playable once and live for 8 hours. A multi-platform demo released on May 1, 2021, for all platforms. It allowed players to explore both the Village and Castle for 60 minutes and it was live for a seven-day period.

Village was released for PlayStation 4, PlayStation 5, Stadia, Windows, Xbox One, and Xbox Series X/S on May 7, 2021. In celebration of the release, Capcom commissioned a large chalk artwork of a Lycan creature to be drawn on a hillside at Somerset. The artwork was 58 meters high and over 100 meters long. In Japan, the game was released in two versions to comply with local regulations, a CERO Z version that is legally restricted to ages 18 and up, and a CERO D version with less violence that is available to ages 17 and up with no legal restrictions. Both versions contain less violence than the international releases. A collector's edition was made available for the console versions, featuring extras such as a Chris Redfield figurine, a hardcover art book, and a village map poster. A macOS version and a cloud version for Nintendo Switch were both released on October 28, 2022. In June 2022, it was announced that the PlayStation 5 version would receive support for the PlayStation VR2 headset in the future. The virtual reality mode was released alongside the headset on February 22, 2023.

Downloadable content

At E3 2021, Capcom announced that downloadable content for the game was in development. At the Capcom Showcase in June 2022, the Winters' Expansion was revealed. It includes a new story expansion titled Shadows of Rose, featuring Rosemary Winters as the playable protagonist, alongside a third-person camera mode for the main story, and two new stages and Chris Redfield, Lady Dimitrescu, and Karl Heisenberg as additional playable characters for the Mercenaries mode. The expansion released for the PlayStation 4, PlayStation 5, Windows, Xbox One, and Xbox Series X/S versions on October 28, 2022, for the Nintendo Switch cloud version on December 2, 2022, and for the macOS version on January 13, 2023.

Reception

Resident Evil Village received "generally favorable reviews" on all platforms from critics, according to review aggregator Metacritic.

Several critics noted the more action-centered gameplay in comparison to Resident Evil 7 and compared the switch in direction to that of Resident Evil 4. Phil Hornshaw of GameSpot wrote that while he felt Resident Evil 7 leaned towards the "dark and creepy haunted house" setting akin to Resident Evil, Village took cues from the "faster, panickier" Resident Evil 4. IGNs Tristan Ogilvie saw the game as successfully taking the best elements of the action from Resident Evil 4 and combining it with the modern design from Resident Evil 7. Hornshaw praised the new direction taken by the game, feeling its notable departure from Resident Evil 7 was what made it work as a sequel and opined that the game provided an excellent balance of action and scares. Conversely, Leon Hurley of GameRadar was critical of the new approach, calling it a shame that the title was "one of the 'not a horror game' Resident Evils" and concluded that whilst the game was fun, it had undone the work of Resident Evil 7 in redefining the series. Later sections of the game received mixed opinions for their emphasis on action. Ogilvie praised the final chapters for their "chaotic levels of carnage" that reminded him of a run-and-gun Call of Duty campaign, whereas both Hornshaw and Hurley criticised the sections for being too action-heavy, negatively comparing them to Call of Duty and "the worst action-heavy portions" of Resident Evil 6.

Critics praised the variety of gameplay throughout each section of the game. Hornshaw commended the diversity of horror ideas, finding it impressive how skilfully the game switched between them, and called each area "fun, intense, and, naturally, frightening in its own way." Hurley lauded the sections in the game's first half as "full of atmosphere and intrigue as you explore". He gave particular praise to the second area for being "one of the best horror moments I've played in a long time", but thought that the game's latter half felt average, especially in comparison to the game's greater parts. Despite this, he opined that the shifting of ideas throughout the game created excitement for what was coming next. Ogilvie noted the changes in gameplay for each section, with one catered towards stealth, while another leaned towards psychological horror over combat. He also praised the increased variety of enemies compared to Resident Evil 7, saying that it added "depth and decision making" to crafting, forcing the player to decide which items would have the most effect on certain enemies. The more open-world style of exploration was well received by critics. Hurley wrote that Resident Evil Village was the first time the series had experimented with open-world, and that a lot of his time was spent exploring and retreading areas with new skills and discovering new surprises. Ogilvie concurred, writing that exploring the village itself as the game's central aspect helped distinguish it from previous installments. He felt exploration was rewarding from unlocking new paths and secrets, further augmented by the inclusion of a merchant character which motivated him to explore in search of tradable items.

Common weaknesses of the game were considered to be its boss fights and puzzles. Hurley thought that the quality of the puzzles was "consistently low", in particular criticizing an example in which a map is given to find a locked door that the player passes previously in the game, and another that had the solution next to it. Ogilvie similarly criticised the puzzles, saying that the solutions were either "exceedingly straightforward" or spoiled by instructional notes left nearby. Hornshaw noted the movement system was unchanged from Resident Evil 7 and as a result felt "a little slow and clunky"; they opined it was better suited when surrounded by enemies rather than during boss battles. Hurley similarly thought that boss fights did not feel designed for first-person combat because of the slower movement, and that dodging attacks in large open spaces meant the player was often forced to move the boss out of their field of view. Ogilvie found that many of the battles fell "surprisingly short" and amounted to little more than dodging and shooting an enemy's weak points, noting that he would have preferred them to be more engaging and "epic-sized". Hornshaw wrote that the game's narrative was not one of the better Resident Evil stories, and was disappointed it did not resolve all of the plot threads from Resident Evil 7 or sufficiently tie the games into the series at large. Hurley also opined that the pacing of the story was "inconsistent", and that due to how much time the player spent exploring, key story sections could either feel "weirdly short, or artificially extended." On the other hand, Ogilvie praised the story as "a compelling mystery" that engaged him throughout his entire playthrough."

The arcade mode "The Mercenaries", which is unlocked on completion of the main game, was praised by Hornshaw for "demonstrat[ing] how tight the combat in Village can be" and for being fun in its own right. Ogilvie also praised the mode as "addictive" and "the most valuable bonus to unlock".

Windows performance 
The Windows version of the game had performance problems, particularly during intense combat. Richard Leadbetter of Digital Foundry noted the "tremendously high frame times" and "extraordinary" stuttering, especially during encounters with the maidens and other enemies with certain animations. Leadbetter attributed this to a combination of Denuvo along with Capcom's own anti-tamper software. In July 2021, a pirated version of the game by an independent cracker was released, effectively stripping away the Denuvo and Capcom digital rights management (DRM) software. Leadbetter tested this version against the original release and was able to confirm that the crack improved upon the game's performance, stating that "By stripping out what the hackers call Capcom's entry points for the DRM... the game is absolutely transformed in those areas." A similar problem where Capcom had added additional DRM atop Denuvo had affected Devil May Cry 5 for Windows, and after Capcom's official update that removed Denuvo and its DRM, Devil May Cry 5s performance was improved. Capcom released a patch for Village later that July that, among other changes, altered how the game used Denuvo. Leadbetter found that the patch improved performance, running equivalent to the pirated version.

Sales
Resident Evil Village shipped over three million units in its first four days of release, becoming the third-fastest-selling title in the Resident Evil series, tied with 2019's Resident Evil 2. At the same time, Capcom announced the series had sold a total of 100 million units since its debut in 1996. From May 3 to May 9, 2021, Famitsu rated the PlayStation 4 version at first place in the Japanese gaming charts, selling 111,171 copies in a week. The PlayStation 5 version sold 38,713 copies, reaching fourth place in the charts. Resident Evil Village was also the best-selling game across the US and the UK during the month of May 2021. It went on to become the eighth-best-selling game of 2021 in the US. The game sold 6.1 million units worldwide by May 2022, and reached 6.4 million units by June 2022.

Accolades

Alleged plagiarism 
Shortly after release, film director Richard Raaphorst accused Capcom of plagiarism, citing close similarities between a monster that was featured in his film Frankenstein's Army and the "Sturm" creature in Resident Evil Village.

Notes

References

External links
 

2021 video games
Amputees in fiction
Bioterrorism in fiction
Cannibalism in fiction
Capcom games
Censored video games
Cloud-based Nintendo Switch games
First-person shooters
Fiction about parasites
Golden Joystick Award for Game of the Year winners
Gothic video games
2020s horror video games
macOS games
Mass murder in fiction
Nintendo Switch games
PlayStation 4 games
PlayStation 4 Pro enhanced games
PlayStation 5 games
PlayStation VR2 games
Resident Evil games
Science fiction video games
Single-player video games
Stadia games
Survival video games
Video game sequels
Child abduction in fiction
Video games about children
Child abuse in fiction
Violence in video games
Video games about cults
Video games about ghosts
Video games about psychic powers
Video games about spirit possession
Video games about the afterlife
Video games about vampires
Video games about witchcraft
Video games developed in Japan
Video games set in 2021
Video games set in castles
Video games set in Eastern Europe
Video games with downloadable content
Windows games
Xbox Cloud Gaming games
Xbox One games
Xbox One X enhanced games
Xbox Series X and Series S games
Werewolf video games